is a Prefectural Natural Park in southwest Miyagi Prefecture, Japan. First designated for protection in 1947, the park spans the municipalities of Kawasaki, Shichikashuku, Shiroishi, and Zaō. The park centres upon the plateau of Mount Zaō and contains a number of onsen.

See also
 National Parks of Japan
 Zaō Quasi-National Park

References

External links
  Maps of Zaō Kōgen Prefectural Natural Park  (26, 27, 29 & 30)

Parks and gardens in Miyagi Prefecture
Protected areas established in 1947
1947 establishments in Japan
Kawasaki, Miyagi
Shichikashuku, Miyagi
Shiroishi, Miyagi
Zaō, Miyagi